Theoretical Archaeology Group (Conference) is an annual  conference focused on theoretical approaches to archaeology.

History 
The Theoretical Archaeology Group was founded in 1979 in order to promote debate and discussion of issues in theoretical archaeology. Its principal activity is the promotion of an annual conference, usually in December. A National Committee manages and steers TAG, consisting of representatives from departments that have held a previous TAG Conference.

The TAG Trustees convene and organize National Committee meetings. They are:

 Colin Renfrew
 Timothy Darvill
 Julian Thomas
 Karina Croucher
 Andrew Fleming (1979 - 2001)

TAG Conferences are also held in TAG North America, SWISS-Tag, TAG Iberico, and Nordic TAG.

Annual Meeting Locations

References 

Archaeological organizations
Organizations established in 1979